Liberation Tower is a skyscraper that will be built in Central Business District (CBD) at Purbachal Sector 19 in Dhaka, Bangladesh. The project is a part of Bangabandhu Tri-Towers project, which will include two other towers: Language Tower (244m) and Legacy Tower (428m).

References

Purbachal
Proposed skyscrapers
Proposed buildings and structures in Bangladesh
Skyscrapers in Bangladesh